

From 6,000 to 6,999 

 
 
 6002 Eetion
 
 
 
 
 
 
 
 
 
 
 
 
 
 
 
 
 6025 Naotosato
 
 
 
 
 
 
 
 
 
 
 6042 Cheshirecat
 
 
 
 
 
 
 
 
 
 
 
 
 
 
 6063 Jason
 
 
 
 
 
 6070 Rheinland
 
 
 
 
 
 
 
 
 
 
 
 
 
 6084 Bascom
 
 
 
 
 
 6090 Aulis
 
 
 
 
 
 
 
 
 
 6102 Visby
 
 
 
 
 
 
 
 
 
 
 
 
 
 6117 Brevardastro
 
 
 
 
 
 
 
 
 
 
 
 
 
 
 
 
 
 
 
 
 
 
 
 6141 Durda
 
 
 6144 Kondojiro
 
 
 
 
 
 
 
 
 
 
 
 
 
 
 6159 Andréseloy
 
 
 
 
 
 
 
 
 
 
 6170 Levasseur
 
 
 
 
 
 
 
 
 
 6181 Bobweber
 
 
 
 
 
 
 
 6189 Völk
 
 
 
 
 
 
 
 
 
 
 
 
 
 
 
 
 
 
 
 
 
 
 
 
 
 
 6216 San Jose
 
 
 
 
 
 6223 Dahl
 
 
 
 
 
 6229 Tursachan
 
 
 
 
 
 6235 Burney
 
 
 
 6239 Minos
 
 
 
 6244 Okamoto
 
 
 6247 Amanogawa
 
 6250 Saekohayashi
 
 
 6255 Kuma
 
 6257 Thorvaldsen
 
 
 
 
 
 
 
 6267 Rozhen
 
 
 
 
 
 
 
 
 
 
 
 
 
 
 
 
 
 
 
 
 
 
 6296 Cleveland
 
 
 
 
 
 
 
 
 
 
 
 
 
 6312 Robheinlein
 
 
 
 
 
 
 
 
 
 
 
 
 
 
 
 
 
 
 
 
 
 
 
 
 
 
 6349 Acapulco
 
 
 
 
 
 
 
 
 
 
 
 
 
 
 
 
 
 
 
 
 
 
 
 6376 Schamp
 6377 Cagney
 
 
 
 
 
 
 
 
 
 
 
 6395 Hilliard
 
 6398 Timhunter
 
 
 
 
 
 
 
 
 
 
 
 
 
 
 
 
 
 
 
 
 
 
 
 
 
 
 6433 Enya
 
 
 
 
 
 
 
 
 
 
 
 
 
 
 
 
 
 
 
 
 
 
 6460 Bassano
 
 
 
 
 
 
 
 
 6469 Armstrong
 6470 Aldrin
 
 
 
 
 
 6478 Gault
 
 
 
 
 
 
 
 
 
 
 6489 Golevka
 
 
 
 6498 Ko
 
 6500 Kodaira
 
 
 
 
 
 
 
 
 
 
 
 
 
 
 
 
 
 6522 Aci
 
 
 
 
 
 
 
 
 
 
 
 
 
 
 6537 Adamovich
 
 
 
 
 
 
 
 6545 Leitus
 6546 Kaye
 
 
 
 
 
 
 
 
 
 
 
 
 
 
 
 
 
 
 
 
 
 
 
 
 
 
 
 
 
 
 
 
 
 
 
 
 
 
 
 
 
 
 
 
 
 
 
 
 
 
 
 
 
 
 
 
 
 
 
 
 
 6615 Plutarchos
 
 
 
 
 
 
 
 
 
 
 
 
 
 
 
 
 
 
 
 
 
 
 
 
 
 
 
 
 
 
 
 
 
 
 
 
 
 
 
 
 
 
 
 
 
 
 
 
 
 
 
 
 
 
 
 
 
 
 
 
 
 
 
 
 
 
 
 
 
 
 
 
 
 
 
 
 6708 Bobbievaile
 6709 Hiromiyuki
 
 
 
 
 
 
 
 
 
 
 
 
 
 
 6726 Suthers
 
 
 
 
 
 
 
 
 
 
 
 
 
 
 
 
 
 
 
 
 
 
 
 
 
 
 
 
 
 
 
 
 
 
 
 
 
 
 
 
 
 
 
 
 
 
 
 
 
 
 
 
 
 
 6793 Palazzolo
 
 
 
 
 
 
 
 
 
 
 6805 Abstracta
 
 
 
 
 
 
 
 
 
 
 
 
 
 
 
 
 
 
 
 
 
 
 
 
 
 
 
 
 
 
 
 
 
 
 
 
 
 
 
 
 
 
 
 
 
 
 
 
 
 
 
 
 
 
 
 
 
 
 
 
 
 
 
 
 
 
 6882 Sormano
 
 
 
 
 
 
 
 
 
 
 
 
 
 
 
 
 
 
 
 
 
 
 
 
 
 
 
 
 
 
 
 
 
 
 
 
 
 
 
 
 
 
 
 
 
 
 
 
 
 
 
 
 
 
 
 
 
 
 
 
 
 
 
 
 
 
 
 
 
 
 
 
 
 
 
 
 
 6980 Kyusakamoto

See also 
 List of minor planet discoverers
 List of observatory codes

References

External links 
 Discovery Circumstances: Numbered Minor Planets, Minor Planet Center

Lists of minor planets by name